The King of the Bla Bla Bla (original title "Le Roi du bla bla bla") is a French comedy crime film from 1951, directed by Maurice Labro, written by Claude Boissol, starring Paul Azaïs and Louis de Funès as gangsters Bébert and Gino.

Cast 
 Paul Azaïs: Bébert
 Louis de Funès: Gino
 Irène de Trébert: the villain's wife
 Christian Duvaleix: Moustique, the gangster
 Jean-Jacques Delbo: Loustot, the gangster
 Jean Tissier: Mr Lafare, the shady banker
 Lise Delamare: Lucienne Lafare, the banker's wife
 Jean Richard: Jacques
 Roger Nicolas: Prosper Bourrache, the honest hawker
 Robert Lombard: Hubert
 Albert Michel: Charlie
 Serge Berry: Vivarol
 Nicole Guezel: Madeleine
 Ben Chemoul: Riri
 Marcel Loche: a servant

References

External links 
 
 Le Roi du bla bla bla (1951) at the Films de France

1951 films
1950s crime comedy films
French crime comedy films
1950s French-language films
French black-and-white films
Films directed by Maurice Labro
1951 comedy films
1950s French films